Giulio Cesare Graziani (24 January 1915 Affile – 23 December 1998 Rome) was an Italian aviator, and one of the most famous Italian pilots of the Savoia-Marchetti SM.79 Sparviero torpedo bomber, the "Damned Hunchback", in World War II.

Career
Born on 24 January 1915 the son of Ermenegildo and Giovanna Lonfernini, Graziani developed an early interest in aviation, gaining his pilots license before the age of 20 at Rimini Airport with a Caproni Ca.100 thanks to the influence of Rodolfo Graziani. He joined the Regia Aeronautica and served initially flying Savoia-Marchetti SM.81 bomber aircraft at the start of World War II.

During 1940, he transferred to the Savoia-Marchetti SM.79 and developed particular skill attacking shipping with torpedoes, initially in the Red Sea theatre and later over the Mediterranean Sea. He was injured in action attacking Port Sudan in December 1940 but successfully piloted his aircraft home, for which he was awarded the Gold Medal of Military Valor. He was also responsible for a night raid on shipping in the harbour at Philippeville which destroyed one ship and damaged another on 20 November 1942.

Following the Armistice of Cassibile, Graziani flew Martin Baltimores for the Italian Co-belligerent Air Force, flying a total of 78 bombing missions. After the war, Graziani was heavily involved in the deployment of the PGM-19 Jupiter nuclear missiles in Italy. He was promoted to Generale di squadra aerea in 1969 and retired in 1975.

Legacy
The 70º Stormo of the current Aeronautica Militare Italiana, based at Latina Air Base, was named after him.

References

1915 births
1998 deaths
Grand Officers of the Order of Merit of the Italian Republic
Italian World War II pilots
 Recipients of the Gold Medal of Military Valor
People from the Metropolitan City of Rome Capital
Regia Aeronautica personnel of World War II